Language Change: Progress or Decay? is a book on language change by Jean Aitchison in which the author concludes that language change is neither a process of decay nor is it in itself progress.

Reception
The book was reviewed by Philip Baldi, Edwin L. Battistella and John Mullen.

References

External links
Language Change: Progress or Decay?
3rd edition

1981 non-fiction books
Cambridge University Press books
Historical linguistics books